Fonte Nuova is a comune (municipality) in the Metropolitan City of Rome in the Italian region Lazio, located about  northeast of Rome.

The comune was created in 2001 from the frazioni of Tor Lupara di Mentana and Santa Lucia di Mentana, once belonging to Mentana, and that of Tor Lupara of Guidonia Montecelio.

References

External links
 Official website

Cities and towns in Lazio